John Finn is a Canadian politician, who represented Stephenville-Port au Port in the Newfoundland and Labrador House of Assembly from 2015 until 2019 as a member of the Liberal Party.

Finn was elected in the 2015 provincial election. He ran for re-elected in the 2019 provincial election but was defeated.

Prior to entering provincial politics, Finn worked with the Community Education Network in Stephenville as an employment counsellor and a housing and homelessness caseworker. He was elected to town council in Stephenville in 2013 serving until his election to the provincial legislature.

References

Living people
Liberal Party of Newfoundland and Labrador MHAs
21st-century Canadian politicians
Year of birth missing (living people)